The Battle of Nevel was fought during the Livonian War between the Kingdom of Poland and the Tsardom of Russia on August 19, 1562.

After Russian forces took Nevel, Polish forces undertook a pillaging raid into the new Russian-held territory. A bigger Russian detachment led by Andrey Kurbsky could not defeat the retreating Polish detachment under the command of Stanisław Leśniowolski.

Modern Polish researches estimating the number of Russians as 25,000. According to the Russian military historian Alexander Filyushkin, this is practically a half of the overall Russian military forces of Ivan the Terrible. He considered the battle as neither a Russian victory nor a Russian defeat but just a missed chance to spontaneously punish the pillagers. He also considers that the battle was massively exaggerated for political reasons in the Polish-Lithuanian chronicles. The Russian losses caused by a 1,500 men strong Lithuanian force grew to over 8,000 while the overall strength of the Russian army was described as 40,000 people.

References

Nevel
Nevel
Nevel
Nevel
History of Pskov Oblast
1562 in Europe